, born February 10, 1974, in Yokosuka, Kanagawa Prefecture, is a Japanese rock singer. IN MY DREAM, her first single, was featured as the opening theme of the anime Brain Powerd.

Discography

Singles
05/21/1998 - IN MY DREAM
10/21/1998 - 
05/21/1999 - Good Luck to You
11/20/1999 - 
01/24/2001 - CRIME
2001 - gain
2001 - gain/grave
10/23/2002 -

Albums
11/21/1998 - HARD VOLTAGE
01/21/2000 - Monkey on my back
02/21/2002 - POWER STRIP

External links
Official Twitter page
Official Youtube channel
Official site
Official blog

1974 births
Living people
People from Yokosuka, Kanagawa
Musicians from Kanagawa Prefecture
21st-century Japanese singers
21st-century Japanese women singers